Rita Coolidge is the self-titled debut album by Rita Coolidge.

Track listing

Side one
"That Man Is My Weakness" (Donna Weiss, Craig Doerge) – 3:50
"Second Story Window" (Marc Benno) – 3:00
"Crazy Love" (Van Morrison) – 3:35
"The Happy Song" (Otis Redding, Steve Cropper) – 3:50
"Seven Bridges Road" (Steve Young) – 5:55

Side two
"Born Under a Bad Sign" (Booker T. Jones, William Bell) – 4:10
"Ain't That Peculiar" (William Robinson, Pete Moore, Bobby Rogers, Marv Tarplin) – 4:02
"I Always Called Them Mountains" (Marc Benno) – 3:47
"Mud Island" (Donna Weiss, Mary Unobsky) – 4:28
"I Believe in You" (Neil Young) – 3:10

Album notes
"That Man Is My Weakness"
Leon Russell – piano, organ
Spooner Oldham – electric piano
Clarence White – guitar
Marc Benno – guitar
Chris Ethridge – bass
Jim Keltner – drums

"Second Story Window"
Stephen Stills – acoustic guitars
Booker T. Jones – bass
Jim Keltner – percussion

"Crazy Love"
Booker T. Jones – piano, organ
Stephen Stills – guitar
Bobby Womack – guitar
Donald "Duck" Dunn – bass
Jim Keltner – drums
Bobbye Hall Porter – tambourine

"The Happy Song"
Booker T. Jones – organ
Spooner Oldham – electric piano
Clarence White – guitar
Jerry McGee – guitar
Chris Ethridge – bass
Jim Keltner – drums
Bobbye Hall Porter – tambourine

"Seven Bridges Road"
Booker T. Jones – piano
Spooner Oldham - organ
Clarence White – acoustic guitar
Jerry McGee – Dobro, electric sitar
Chris Ethridge – bass
Jim Keltner – drums
Bobbye Hall Porter – bongos
Plas Johnson – alto saxophone

"Born Under a Bad Sign"
Booker T. Jones – electric piano
Spooner Oldham – organ
Clarence White – guitar
Ry Cooder – bottleneck guitar
Chris Ethridge – bass
Jim Keltner – drums
Bobbye Hall Porter – congas
Clifford Scott – tenor saxophone

"Ain’t That Peculiar"
Booker T. Jones – electric piano
Clarence White – guitar
Jerry McGee – guitar
Chris Ethridge – bass
Jim Keltner – drums
Bobbye Hall Porter – tambourine, congas

"(I Always Called Them) Mountains"
Clarence White – guitar
Jerry Mcgee – acoustic guitar
Spooner Oldham – organ, piano
Chris Ethridge – bass
Jim Keltner - drums

"Mud Island"
Booker T. Jones – organ, guitar
Spooner Oldham – electric piano
Clarence White – guitar
Ry Cooder – bottleneck guitar
Fuzzy Samuels – bass
Jim Keltner – drums, percussion
Bobbye Hall Porter – tambourine, congas

"I Believe in You"
Spooner Oldham – electric piano
Clarence White – acoustic guitar
Jerry McGee – acoustic guitar
Booker T. Jones – bass
Jim Keltner – drums

Horns
Jim Horn - baritone, alto & tenor saxophone
John Kelson – tenor saxophone & bass clarinet
Don Menza – tenor & alto saxophone & bass clarinet
Clifford Scott – tenor saxophone
Peter Christlieb – tenor saxophone
Plas Johnson – tenor & alto saxophone
George Bohanon – trombone & baritone horn
Lew McCreary – trombone
Ernie Tack – trombone
Jack Redmond – trombone
Dick Hyde – trombone
Oliver Mitchell – trumpet & Flugal horn
Charles Findley – trumpet & Flugal horn
Al Aarons – trumpet & Flugal horn
Dalton Smith – trumpet & Flugal horn
Vincent DeRosa – French horn
Bill Hinshaw – French horn
Arthur Maebe – French horn
David Duke – French horn

Strings
Jesse Ehrlich – cello
Jerome Kessler – cello
Leonard Malarsky – violin
William Kurasch – violin
Wilbert Nutycomb -  violin
James Getzoff – violin
Harry Bluestone – violin
Ralph Schaeffer – violin
Gareth Nuttycombe – viola
Samuel Boghossian – viola

Background Vocals
The Blackberries – Clydie King, Venetta Fields, Sherlie Matthews, Priscilla Coolidge, Donna Weiss, and Rita Coolidge with Graham Nash, Bob Segarini and Randy Bishop on “Crazy Love"
Arranger:  String and Horn Arrangements by Booker T. Jones with the exception of “Ain’t That Peculiar”, “Born Under a Bad Sign”,  and “That Man Is My Weakness” arranged by Jim Horn and his Dynamite Horn Section
Engineer:  Bruce Botnick
Recorded at Sunset Sound Recorders
Cover Photograph:  Joel Bernstein
Art Direction:  Roland Young

Charts

References

Rita Coolidge albums
1971 debut albums
Albums produced by David Anderle
A&M Records albums
Albums recorded at Sunset Sound Recorders